Dmytro Ivanov (: born 30 September 1989) is a Ukrainian goalkeeper.

External links

Profile at Official FC BATE Site

1989 births
Living people
Footballers from Kyiv
Ukrainian footballers
Ukrainian expatriate footballers
Expatriate footballers in Belarus
Association football goalkeepers
FC Nafkom Brovary players
FC Irpin Horenychi players
FC BATE Borisov players
FC Prykarpattia Ivano-Frankivsk (2004) players
FC Dinaz Vyshhorod players
FC Shakhtar Sverdlovsk players
FC Dynamo Khmelnytskyi players
FC Nyva Ternopil players
FC Arsenal Kyiv players
SC Chaika Petropavlivska Borshchahivka players
Ukrainian First League players
Ukrainian Second League players
21st-century Ukrainian people